NGC 402 is a star located in the constellation of Pisces. It was discovered on October 7, 1874 by Lawrence Parsons.

References

0402
18741007
NGC 402
Discoveries by Lawrence Parsons